Cendrillon au Far West (French for "Cinderella in the Far West") is a French/Belgian 2012 animated film. The film was directed and screenplay written by Pascal Hérold and produced by Delacave Studios.

Plot 
The story starts off in a small western styled town called Felicity City with Cinderella, a doe, complaining about the lack of mannerisms with the males as she works for her stepmother, Felicity, a pug. A train then arrives with a classy canine prince and his cheeky turkey mother, Duchess. Felicity throws a ball in the local saloon to celebrate the coming of royalty all the while plotting to get one of her two daughters married to the prince. Cinderella having seen and been infatuated with the prince laments that she can't attend as Felicity kept all attractive females out of the ball. A shaman friend of Cinderella sees her and helps her get into the ball by casting a spell that gave her a mask, make up, and a dress that will wear out at midnight. Cinderella now disguised forces her way into the ball and catches the princes eyes immediately. They begin to dance meanwhile the princes mother and Cinderella's stepmother enjoy a game of poker in a backroom. Felicity hustles the queen of all her earnings by pretending to not know how to play well and eventually convinces her to bet her son's hand in marriage. By cheating she wins and the queen feels bad for what she did. Then the ball gets attacked by a group of primate outlaws seeking to capture the queen and prince. They manage to capture the queen but the prince evades capture because Cinderella fought to protect him, losing a tooth in the process. Cinderella flees the saloon as her spell wears off, the prince is knocked out cold by Felicity who is determined to give him to one of her daughters.

The next morning the prince manages to escape Felicity's goons by putting them to sleep by playing a violin. He then meets Cinderella, not recognizing her and the shaman. Out to rescue his mother and find the woman who he danced with the night before with only her tooth to go by, Cinderella and the shaman go with him to help him find his mother. As they go, Felicity gets her daughters and goons and hunts after them. While this is happening the outlaws take the queen back to their hideout, a ship in the middle of quicksand, and try to politely threaten her to sign a will that would give their leader her inheritance. She takes advantage of the polite nature of the leader and bides her time while her son and Cinderella run from Felicity and track the outlaws. During their journeys, the prince eventually realizes that Cinderella is that mystery woman from the ball.

As Felicity catches up to Cinderella and crew she pulls out a gun and tries to shoot Cinderella. The prince and shaman lose them through luring and tricking them to fall off a cliff. They then find themselves in a forest dense with bizarre flora, where the bandits find them and begin to ride vultures to chase them, ultimately they find the bandit hideout and Cinderella gets captured by the bandits, while the shaman is left to die. While the bandit leader, Jefe, tries to threaten the duchess by threatening to kill her son if she didn't sign a contract. The threat is interrupted by Felicity and her goons shooting cannon balls at their ship, ultimately causing it to begin sinking. The bandits, frightened, begin to abandon ship while the prince fights the leader. The fight is cut short when Felicity and her goons and daughters arrive and hold the captain at gunpoint to marry herself and the prince. Cinderella lights a cannon that was stuck to the captain's leg and it fires him off into the distance. The damage from the cannon fire begins to cause the ship to break into pieces and sink. At the which Cinderella, the duchess, and the prince, make their way to one end of the ship. Felicity is stuck on a part that's sinking faster, Cinderella offers her hand to help, but Felicity refuses, and dies. The shaman appears at the last moment with vultures and saves the three protagonists. The movie ends with Cinderella and the prince taking the train to leave the town, presumably to marry and live at the prince's home country.

Cast 
 Alexandra Lamy as Cendrillon
 Antoine de Caunes as Le Prince
 Yolande Moreau as Felicity
 Michel Boujenah as Petite Fumée
 Isabelle Nanty as The Grand Duchess
 Philippe Peythieu as Barbazul
 Véronique Augereau as Harmony
 Audrey Lamy as Melody
 Hervé Lassïnce as Dark Lopez
 Jessica Gee as Felicity
 Grant George as Bandit Monkeys
 Joe Thomas as Little Cloud

References

External links
Cendrillon au Far West on Zippy Frames

2012 animated films
2012 films
Belgian animated films
French animated films
2012 computer-animated films
Films based on Cinderella
2010s French-language films
2010s French animated films
2010s children's animated films
French-language Belgian films